Emmanuel Church is a historic church at 334 Columbus Avenue in Sandusky, Ohio.

It was built in 1866 and added to the National Register in 1982.

References

United Church of Christ churches in Ohio
Churches on the National Register of Historic Places in Ohio
Churches completed in 1866
Churches in Erie County, Ohio
National Register of Historic Places in Erie County, Ohio
1866 establishments in Ohio